Big Al may refer to:

People
 Al Anderson (born 1947), American guitarist, singer and songwriter
 Adolfo Bruno (1945–2003), American mobster
 Al Capone (1899–1947), American gangster
 Big Al Carson (born 1953), American blues and jazz singer
 Al Downing (musician) (1940–2005), American singer, songwriter and pianist
 Al Jefferson (born 1985), American National Basketball Association player
 Al Sears (1910–1990), American jazz saxophonist and bandleader
 Alan Shearer (born 1970), former Newcastle and England International footballer
 Alan Sues (1926–2011), American actor known for roles on Rowan & Martin's Laugh-In (1968–1972)
 Al Szolack (born c. 1950), American former basketball player for the Washington Generals, the team which always loses to the Harlem Globetrotters
 Al Unser (born 1939), former race car driver
 Alfred Williams (born 1968), American former National Football League player
 Big Al (comedian), Australian comedian
 Al Green (wrestler) (1955–2013), American professional wrestler Alfred Dobalo, ring name "Big Al"
 911 (wrestler) (born Alfred Poling in 1957), professional wrestler who briefly wrestled as "Big Al" in 1997

Arts and entertainment
 Big Al (play), a 2002 off-Broadway play
 Big Al (book), a children's picture book by Andrew Clements
 Big Al (Cars), a character in the film Cars who is mentioned, but not seen
 Big Al, a character in the Ratchet & Clank video game series
 Big Al, a character in the 1984 TV series The Beiderbecke Affair and its sequels
 The Vocaloid "Big Al"
 Big Al, a minor character from Mona the Vampire

Other uses
 Big Al Brewing, a craft brewery 
 Big Al (fossil), a nearly complete dinosaur specimen discovered in Wyoming in 1991
 Big Al (mascot), the elephant mascot of the University of Alabama

See also
 Big Al's, one of the first topless bars in San Francisco and the United States, later an adult book store which closed in 2009
 Big Gay Al, a character from South Park

Lists of people by nickname